Hicham Ben Ghazia (born in Tunisia) is a professional football coach, fitness trainer, and general coordinator of teams, he started as coach of the CU Bardo 2 women's team in 2005, and currently works as an assistant coach at the Iraqi club Al-Minaa.

Managerial career
Ghazia was assistant coach with Fathi Laabidi for Olympique Béja in 2012, before as a physical trainer at Al-Shaab in the UAE, then assistant coach with Abdul-Hafeedh Arbeesh in the Libya national football team from 2012 to 2013, then assistant coach with Fathi Laabidi for club CS Hammam-Lif from 2014 to 2015, then fitness coach with Maher Kanzari for Stade Tunisien in 2016, and again with Abdul-Hafeedh Arbeesh at the Libyan club Al-Ittihad.

Ghazia moved to Iraq in 2017 to work as a fitness coach for Al-Minaa, then an assistant coach, then a coach in the same club.

Managerial statistics

References

External links
 Profile on kooora.com 

Living people
Sportspeople from Tunis
Tunisian Ligue Professionnelle 1 players
Expatriate football managers in Iraq
Tunisian expatriate sportspeople in the United Arab Emirates
Tunisian expatriate sportspeople in Libya
Al-Mina'a SC managers
Year of birth missing (living people)
Tunisian football managers
Tunisian expatriate football managers
Association footballers not categorized by position
Association football players not categorized by nationality